VMT may refer to:

 Virtual maintenance training,  type of training method that includes computer-based interactive 3D simulations of virtual equipment
 Vehicle miles of travel, a measurement of the number of miles traveled within a specified region over a given time period
 Video mixtape, a stock footage movie consisting of clips from movies, television, or home videos.
 Virtual method table, a mechanism used in programming language to support dynamic dispatch

See also
 Vehicle miles traveled tax
 Virgin Media Television (disambiguation)